Serhiy Oleksandrovych Rybalka (born 1 April 1990) is a Ukrainian professional footballer who plays as a midfielder for Oleksandriya.

Club career

Arsenal Kharkiv
Born in Yamne, Sumy Oblast, Ukrainian SSR, Rybalka was the top scorer in Arsenal Kharkiv's history, by scoring 20 goals and surpassing Yuriy Martiniuk who had 19 goals. He caught the interest from many clubs, including from the Israeli Premier League club Maccabi Haifa who saw him as a very talented and perspective youth player. However, he chose to go to FC Dynamo Kyiv.

Dynamo Kyiv
Rybalka made his senior team debut on 21 September 2011 in the Ukrainian Cup 3–2 victory against Kremin Kremenchuk. He opened the score in the 14th minute, hitting the free kick into the upper corner. A month later, on 23 October 2011, he made his Ukrainian Premier League debut, coming on at half time in a 6-1 thrashing of Zorya Luhansk.

After the debut, Rybalka struggled to establish himself in the squad. In order to help his development, it was decided to loan him to Czech club Slovan Liberec until the end of the 2012–2013 season. Rybalka immediately became one of the key players for Slovan, and in the summer of 2013 his loan was extended for one more season. Rybalka again featured prominently in the side, helping Slovan reach the Round of 32 in the 2013–14 UEFA Europa League.

After a successful loan spell, Rybalka returned to Dynamo for the 2014–15 season. New team manager Serhii Rebrov put a lot more trust in him than did Dynamo's previous managers Yuri Syomin and Oleh Blokhin, by making him a permanent fixture in midfield. On 17 May 2015, in a 1-0 Ukrainian Premier League victory against Dnipro, Rybalka assisted on what became the title-clinching goal by Domagoj Vida. On 16 September 2015, Rybalka made his UEFA Champions League debut in a 2–2 draw against Portuguese team FC Porto in the group stage, he assisted Dynamo's second goal which was scored by Vitaliy Buyalskyi on the 89th minute which gave Dynamo a draw.

Sivasspor
On 8 September 2017, Rybalka was loaned to Sivasspor, who had just returned to the Turkish Super League after a one-year absence. After a season on loan, Sivasspor bought Rybalka out of his Dynamo Kyiv contract, and signed him to a three-year deal.

International career

Rybalka was part of the Ukraine U-19 team that won the 2009 UEFA European Under-19 Championship. On 27 July 2009, in the last match of the group stage against Switzerland, with hosts Ukraine playing a man down and facing elimination from the tournament, Rybalka scored in the 85th minute to establish the final score (1-0), and to propel Ukraine into the semifinal round. He ended up playing in three of his team's five matches, including the Final against England.

On 31 March 2015, Rybalka made his senior team debut for Ukraine in a friendly match against Latvia, coming on at half-time for Dynamo Kyiv teammate Denys Garmash. He became a regular player for Ukraine for the remainder of the UEFA Euro 2016 qualifying, featuring in the last six matches, including the play-offs against Slovenia. Rybalka was on Ukraine's squad for the UEFA Euro 2016 final tournament in France, but did not play in any of his team's matches.

Career statistics

Club

International

Honours
Dynamo Kyiv
Ukrainian Premier League: 2014–15, 2015–16
Ukrainian Cup: 2014–15
Ukrainian Super Cup: 2016

Other
2009 UEFA European Under-19 Football Championship: Champion

References

External links
 
 

1990 births
Living people
Ukrainian footballers
Ukrainian Premier League players
Ukrainian First League players
Ukrainian Second League players
FC Slovan Liberec players
Czech First League players
Süper Lig players
Ukrainian expatriate footballers
Expatriate footballers in the Czech Republic
FC Arsenal Kharkiv players
FC Dynamo Kyiv players
FC Dynamo-2 Kyiv players
Association football midfielders
Ukraine international footballers
Ukraine under-21 international footballers
Ukraine youth international footballers
Ukrainian expatriate sportspeople in the Czech Republic
UEFA Euro 2016 players
Sivasspor footballers
FC Oleksandriya players
Expatriate footballers in Turkey
Ukrainian expatriate sportspeople in Turkey
Sportspeople from Sumy Oblast